Close to Shore: A True Story of Terror in an Age of Innocence is a non-fiction book by journalist Michael Capuzzo about the Jersey Shore shark attacks of 1916. The book was published in 2001 by Broadway Books.

References

External links
Close to Shore homepage at RandomHouse.com.

2001 non-fiction books
American non-fiction books
Biology books
History of New Jersey
Sharks
History books about the United States
Broadway Books books